"Movie Klip" is the first single by Danish rock band Nephew from their 2004 album USADSB.

Nephew (band) songs